Colasidia is a genus of beetles in the family Carabidae, containing the following species:

 Colasidia adusta Baehr, 2005 
 Colasidia angusticollis Baehr, 1988 
 Colasidia atra Baehr, 1997 
 Colasidia attenuata Baehr, 1997 
 Colasidia borneensis Baehr, 1997 
 Colasidia brevicornis Baehr, 1988 
 Colasidia burckhardti Baehr, 1997 
 Colasidia convexior Baehr, 1993 
 Colasidia denticollis Baehr, 1997 
 Colasidia depressa Baehr, 1997 
 Colasidia garainae Baehr, 2000 
 Colasidia gerardi Baehr, 1982 
 Colasidia globiceps Baehr, 1991 
 Colasidia harpago Baehr, 2005 
 Colasidia helvetorum Baehr, 1997 
 Colasidia kokodae Baehr, 1991 
 Colasidia lagadiga (Morvan, 1994) 
 Colasidia laticeps Baehr, 1997 
 Colasidia loebli Baehr, 1997 
 Colasidia longicollis Baehr, 2005 
 Colasidia lustrans Baehr, 1991 
 Colasidia macrops Baehr, 1990 
 Colasidia madang Darlington, 1971 
 Colasidia malayica Basilewsky, 1954 
 Colasidia mateui Baehr, 1997 
 Colasidia monteithi Baehr, 1987 
 Colasidia oviceps Baehr, 1997 
 Colasidia papua Darlington, 1968 
 Colasidia pumila Baehr, 1990 
 Colasidia riedeli Baehr, 1990 
 Colasidia rougemonti (Morvan, 1994) 
 Colasidia similis Baehr, 1997 
 Colasidia taylori Baehr, 1988 
 Colasidia triangularis Baehr, 1997 
 Colasidia wau Baehr, 2004

References

Dryptinae